WOFR (89.5 FM) is a radio station broadcasting a religious format. Licensed to Schoolcraft, Michigan, it began broadcasting in 2003. WOFR is an affiliate of the reorganized Family Radio network and airs several Christian ministry broadcasts from noted teachers such as RC Sproul, Alistair Begg, Ken Ham, John F. MacArthur, Adriel Sanchez, Dennis Rainey, John Piper, & others as well as traditional and modern hymns & songs by Keith & Kristyn Getty, The Master's Chorale, Fernando Ortega, Chris Rice, Shane & Shane, Sovereign Grace Music, Sara Groves, & multiple other Christian and Gospel music artists.

References
Michiguide.com - WOFR History

External links

Family Radio stations
Radio stations established in 2003
OFR